Szymon Rduch (born 17 August 1989) is a Polish basketball player for the Polish 3x3 national team.

He represented Poland at the 2020 Summer Olympics.

References

1989 births
Living people
3x3 basketball players at the 2020 Summer Olympics
Olympic 3x3 basketball players of Poland
People from Kołobrzeg
Polish men's basketball players
Polish men's 3x3 basketball players